The Doctor of the Mad is a 1954 Italian comedy film directed by Mario Mattoli and starring Totò, Franca Marzi and Aldo Giuffrè. It is based on a 1908 Naples-set play of the same name by Eduardo Scarpetta.

Plot summary 
Felice Sciosciammocca is the mayor of Roccasecca, who sent in Naples the nephew Ciccillo, so that he will become a good doctor. But Ciccillo does anything but study, and makes a debt with a loan shark. Also receives a letter that his uncle is going to come to Naples with his family to find him. Ciccillo, who lives in the "Stella Hotel", a full house of "eccentric" people, pretends that Felice believes that the pension is the clinic, and the customers the fools. Felice Sciosciammocca admires everything, but Ciccillo, to heal his debt, must move away. So Felice is left alone in the guest house, doesn't know how to get himself out of trouble...

Cast
 Totò as Felice Sciosciammocca
 Franca Marzi as La moglie di Cristaldi
 Aldo Giuffrè as Ciccillo
 Vittoria Crispo as Amalia
 Carlo Ninchi as L'attore
 Tecla Scarano as La moglie di Felice
 Nerio Bernardi as Il colonello
 Giacomo Furia as Michele
 Nora Ricci as La figlia di Amalia
 Anna Campori as Una signora
 Mario Castellani as Cristaldi
 Amedeo Girardi 
 Ugo D'Alessio 
 Rosita Pisano 
 Pupella Maggio 
 Enzo Garinei 
 Maria Pia Casilio as Margherita

References

Bibliography
 Ennio Bìspuri. Totò: principe clown : tutti i film di Totò. Guida Editori, 1997.

External links

1954 films
1954 comedy films
Italian comedy films
1950s Italian-language films
Italian films based on plays
Films based on works by Eduardo Scarpetta
Films directed by Mario Mattoli
Films with screenplays by Ruggero Maccari
Films set in Naples
Medical-themed films
1950s Italian films